The 2001 Indonesia Open in badminton was held in Jakarta, from July 25 to July 29, 2001. It was a four-star tournament and the prize money was US$150,000.

Venue
Senayan

Final results

Results

Men's singles

Women's singles

Men's doubles

Women's doubles

Mixed doubles

References
Archivierte Seiten von tangkis.tripod.com
tournamentsoftware.com
worldbadminton.com

External links
 Tournament Link

Indonesia Open (badminton)
Indonesia
Sports competitions in Jakarta
2001 in Indonesian sport